Egmore is a neighbourhood of Chennai, India. Situated on the northern banks of the Coovum River, Egmore is an important residential area as well as a commercial and transportation hub. The Egmore Railway Station was the main terminus of the Madras and Southern Mahratta Railway and later, the metre gauge section of the Southern division of the Indian Railways. It continues to be an important railway junction. The Government Museum, Chennai is also situated in Egmore. Other important institutions based in Egmore include the Government Women and Children's Hospital, the Tamil Nadu State Archives and the Tamil Nadu Archaeology Department.  The Wesley Church, Egmore is the oldest church of the region.

History

The earliest references to Egmore occur in the inscriptions of the Chola king Kulothunga I. Under the Chola Empire, Egmore was the headquarters of an administrative division or Nadu called Elumbur Nadu. An inscription of the Nellore Chola king Vijaya Kanda Gopal dated 2 September 1264 speaks of a village in Elumur-Tudarmuni Nadu in Pulal Kottam. A Vijayanagar period inscription of Sriranganatha Yadavaraya records an endowment to a monastery in Thiruvottriyur by a resident of Serruppedu (identified with the present day Chetpet) in Elumur-Tudarmuni Nadu.

Egmore is the Anglicised form of "Ezhumbur", the name of a pre-British era village situated on the northern banks of the River.
Despite the fact that Egmore had been a part of the East India Company's possessions since 1720, it was not until the "Golden age of British rule" stretching from 1858 to 1947 that Egmore witnessed some real growth. The Egmore Museum was one of the first notable monuments to be constructed here. The construction of this famous landmark was undertaken immediately after the Sepoy Mutiny of 1857. The Connemara Library was created as an annex housing the Museum's vast book collection and became operational in 1896.

Egmore, in 1796, was the site of the Military Male Orphan Asylum near Madras. This asylum was headed by Andrew Bell, who invented the Madras System for schooling there.

Various buildings

 Chennai Egmore railway station
 Office of the commissioner of Greater Chennai Police department.
 Hotel Arulappass Multi Cuisine Family Restaurant
 Spencer Plaza
 Hotel Chennai Gate
 Hotel Taj Connemara
 Hotel Ambassador Pallava
 Hotel Westin Park
 Hotel Ashoka
 Parsn Towers
 Madras Studio
 Rajarathinam Stadium
 Mayor Radhakrishnan Hockey Stadium
 Sri Lanka Maha Bodhi Centre

Churches
 St Andrew's Church, Chennai (an old Scottish Presbyterian Church commonly referred to as the 'Kirk')
 Good Shepherd's Convent
 Wesley Church, a Methodist church on the Poonamallee High Road. The church was established and consecrated in 1905 on the site of a garden house purchased by the Mission in 1892.

Education
 Connemara Public Library, one of the biggest libraries in India
 The National Art Gallery (Chennai)
 Government Museum, Chennai
 Directorate of Public Instruction (DPI)
 Women's Christian College
 Ethiraj College for Women
 Don Bosco Higher Secondary School
 Government College of Fine Arts, Chennai
 Madras School of Social Work

Politics

State assembly politics

Egmore has been a stronghold for Dravida Munnetra Kazhagam (DMK), ever since the party's creation. Other than barely losing to Congress in 1962 election, it has consistently voted for DMK, even during times of low popularity for the DMK. However it is worth noting, that recently the Anna Dravida Munnetra Kazhagam (ADMK), have made significant in-grounds, like they have in many localities around Chennai, which used to be DMK strongholds. Egmore is also 1 of the two total constituents won by DMK in 1991 election. This constituent is reserved for scheduled caste.  This is also the first MLA seat held by K Anbazhagan, when he won it in 1957 election.
 Note: In 1989, ADMK was split between Janaki faction and Jayalalithaa faction, and only the Jayalalithaa faction is reported in the ADMK column since they were the highest vote getter from the divided faction. The Janaki faction got 4,293, which is about 5.6% of the voters.

Lok Sabha politics
Egmore assembly constituency is part of Chennai Central (Lok Sabha constituency).

Transport

Egmore Railway Station is the second most important in the state of Tamil Nadu after the Chennai Central Railway Station. It was constructed in 1908 and functioned as the headquarters of the now defunct Madras and Southern Mahratta Railway till 1951.

Egmore is well connected to other parts of the city. Many of the state-run Metropolitan Transport Corporation (MTC) buses run through Egmore. Egmore has its own suburban train station on the Chennai Beach - Tambaram railway line, which connects it to other parts of the city.

References

External links

Chennai

Central business districts
Cities and towns in Chennai district